Events from the year 1643 in Sweden

Incumbents
 Monarch – Christina

Events

Births

 13 January - Axel Wachtmeister, Count of Mälsåker, field marshal (died 1699) 
 9 November - Christina Anna Skytte, baroness and pirate (died 1677) 
 24 December - Israel Kolmodin, hymnwriter and Lutheran priest (died 1709)

Deaths

 Bengt Oxenstierna (governor), diplomat, Privy Councillor (died 1591)

References

 
Years of the 17th century in Sweden
Sweden